Eburia aliciae is a species of beetle in the family Cerambycidae, that can be found in Mexico.

References

aliciae
Beetles described in 2002
Endemic insects of Mexico
Beetles of North America